Antonovka is a rural locality (a village) in Yelbulaktamaksky Selsoviet, Bizhbulyaksky District, Bashkortostan, Russia. The population was 22 as of 2010. There is 1 street.

Geography 
Antonovka is located 13 km south of Bizhbulyak (the district's administrative centre) by road. Verkhnyaya Kurmaza is the nearest rural locality.

References 

Rural localities in Bizhbulyaksky District